Coffee Creek is a  tributary of Brokenstraw Creek in Warren County, Pennsylvania, in the United States.

Coffee Creek joins Brokenstraw Creek in Columbus Township.

See also
List of rivers of Pennsylvania

Notes

References

Rivers of Pennsylvania
Tributaries of the Allegheny River
Rivers of Warren County, Pennsylvania